Bok bok sing is a leisure snack and the first joint venture brand and program in China first released in Guangzhou, China. It is fried potato balls with a logo of an old witch clawing on a great ball on the package.

Background 
With China's economic reform and the normalization of China-US relations, Guangdong was chosen to be a testing ground for the reforms and allowing US companies to operate.

Coca-Cola was the first US company in Guangzhou. It brought American technology targeted on China's consumers.

It was sold for 50 cents Chinese Yuan in the 1980s.

Types 

Bok bok sing has four package sizes: 12/18/23/50 grams.

References

External links 
The official site of Bok bok sing

Chinese cuisine
Snack foods